Suzee Pai (born 8 August 1962) is an American former actress and model who was the Penthouse Pet of the Month in January 1981.

Career

Modeling
Born in Toledo, Ohio, Pai was a Penthouse Pet of the Month in 1981 and also appeared in a follow-up pictorial in June 1982. She was also featured in the annual Sex in the Cinema pictorial in Playboy magazine in November 1982 for the scene shot, but not used, in the movie First Blood. She also competed in the spokesmodel category of the 1980s Ed McMahon entertainment competition show Star Search in its second season.

Acting
Pai went on to appear in several feature films and television shows including the Burt Reynolds action film Sharky's Machine (1981), the Sylvester Stallone action film First Blood (1982), John Carpenter's Big Trouble in Little China (1986), Jakarta (1988), and The Cosby Show (1984). She had a reoccurring role in the NBC comedy-drama Tattingers (1988–1989).

Notes

References

External links
 

1962 births
Living people
Penthouse Pets